Kugel Yerushalmi, also known as Jerusalem kugel, is an Israeli kugel originating from the local Jewish community of Jerusalem in the 1700s.

History

Kugel Yerushalmi is said to have been created in Jerusalem by local Ashkenazi Jews during the 1700s by the followers of the Vilna Gaon, a Jewish religious scholar.

Overview

Jerusalem Kugel differs from other traditional Ashkenazi style noodle kugels in a number of ways. Nonetheless, it has become a staple of Ashkenazi foods. Jerusalem kugel is always made with thin egg noodles, similar in appearance to spaghetti. The defining ingredient of Jerusalem kugel is black pepper, which is uncommon in other varieties of kugel, and which can give it what the New York Times food writer Melissa Clark has described as a "sinus-clearing" potency. It is made with a sauce similar to caramel, which the noodles are then coated with and then seasoned with black pepper before being placed in a baking pan (either a pan with a hole in the middle  similar to a bundt pan, or a round and flat pan similar to a cake pan), and placed in the oven to bake.

Jerusalem kugel does not typically contain dairy, and is pareve.

See also
 Israeli cuisine
 Jewish cuisine
 Potato kugel

References

Ashkenazi Jewish cuisine
Ashkenazi Jewish culture in Jerusalem
Culture of Jerusalem
Israeli cuisine
Jewish noodle dishes
Kugels
Noodle dishes
Old Yishuv
Pasta dishes